Birrong, a suburb of local government area City of Canterbury-Bankstown, is located 22 kilometres south-west of the Sydney central business district, in the state of New South Wales, Australia, and is a part of the South-western Sydney region.

Birrong shares its postcode of 2143 with neighboring suburbs Regents Park and Potts Hill.

Landmarks
Birrong features a large number of community facilities such as six soccer/rugby league fields, tennis courts, a large natural park reserve, a bowls club, and a swimming pool. Birrong also has two high schools, Birrong Boys High School and Birrong Girls High School, and a primary school. A small group of shops is located on Auburn Road, featuring a barber, bakery, newsagent, IGA (including bottle shop and butcher), hair salon and florist.

History
The Aboriginal word Birrong, meaning star, was adopted as the suburb's name around 1927.

One of the first settlers of Birrong was Joseph Hyde Potts who was granted land in the area in 1835 and has Potts Hill named after him.  Development in the area of Birrong increased with the opening of the railway in 1928. Birrong Park, an area that was subject to flooding, was drained as relief work during the Great Depression (1929–1934). The post office opened in 1955.

Demographics
In the 2016 census the population of Birrong was 3,103.

The median age of the Birrong population was 35 years, less than the national median of 38.

51.2% of people were born in Australia. The most common countries of birth were Vietnam 16.9%, China 4.4% and Lebanon 4.0%.

32.6% of people only spoke English at home. Other languages spoken at home included Vietnamese 22.1%, Arabic 15.3%, Cantonese 5.1% and Mandarin 5.1%.

The religious make up of Birrong was Catholic 20.8%, Islam 18.1%, Buddhism 16.4% and No Religion 15.7%.

Education
Birrong Girls High School is a public girls high school that was established as a girls' comprehensive high school in 1957. There are 820 students (2006 estimate) from a wide variety of cultural backgrounds enrolled in the school. 84% of students are from non-English speaking background (NESB) which represents 46 language groups.

Transport 
Birrong is served by a railway station on the Bankstown Line of the Sydney Trains network. Birrong is also serviced by a bus network run by Transdev NSW.

References

Suburbs of Sydney
City of Canterbury-Bankstown